Stan Harrison (born 28 March 1944) is a former Australian rules footballer who played with Carlton in the Victorian Football League (VFL).

Notes

External links 

Stan Harrison's profile at Blueseum

1944 births
Carlton Football Club players
West Preston Football Club players
Australian rules footballers from Victoria (Australia)
Living people